Space Games-3 is a 1980 video game by Creative Computing for the TRS-80 Model I Level II.

Plot summary
Space Games-3 is a collection of four games not individually released: Ultratrek, Romulan, Starwars, and Starlanes.

Reception
J. Mishcon reviewed Space Games-3 in The Space Gamer No. 30. Mishcon commented that "The under ten set will enjoy these games, but don't be surprised if they soon tire and move on."

The game was reviewed in The Dragon #43 by Mark Herro.  Herro commented that "Even though I may not particularly like all of the games in the package, I think Space Games-3 is well worth its modest price tag. If you're into space games, and you have a TRS-80, at least take a look at this package."

References

1980 video games
TRS-80 games
TRS-80-only games
Video games developed in the United States